Keyes is a town in Cimarron County, Oklahoma, United States. The population was 324 at the 2010 census.

History
Keyes was established in 1925 by the Elkhart and Santa Fe Railway (both leased to and a wholly owned subsidiary of the Atchison, Topeka and Santa Fe Railway). The company named the town after a deceased railroad engineer.  The line is now part of the Cimarron Valley Railroad.

Keyes was also the final destination of the Beaver, Meade and Englewood Railroad, which reached town from the east on June 25, 1931.  That line was abandoned in 1972.

Geography

Keyes is at the intersection of U.S. Route 56 and the northern terminus of Oklahoma State Highway 171. Keyes is approximately 16 miles northeast of the Cimarron County seat, Boise City, and about 26 miles southwest of Elkhart, Kansas.

The closest major airport is Liberal Mid-America Regional Airport, about 91 miles.

Demographics

As of the 2010 United States Census, there were 324 people, 131 households, and 88 families residing in the town. There were 234 housing units. The racial makeup of the town was 94.1% White, 0.6% Native American, 0.3% Asian, 2.8% from other races, and 2.2% from two or more races. Hispanic or Latino of any race were 14.2% of the population.

There were 131 households, out of which 30.5% had children under the age of 18 living with them, 67.2% were married couples living together, 6.1% had a female householder with no husband present, and 32.8% were non-families. 29.8% of all households were made up of individuals, and 16.8% had someone living alone who was 65 years of age or older. The average household size was 2.47 and the average family size was 3.08.

In the town, the population was spread out, with 26.2% under the age of 18, 6.8% from 18 to 24, 19.8% from 25 to 44, 26.5% from 45 to 64, and 20.7% who were 65 years of age or older. The median age was 43.0 years. For every 100 females, there were 101.2 males, and for every 100 females age 18 and over, there were 99.2 males.

According to the 2013 American Community Survey, The median income for a household in the town was $36,827, and the median income for a family was $62,639. Males had a median income of $36,750 versus $40,833 for females. The per capita income for the town was $22,522. About 8.1% of families and 23.2% of the population were below the poverty line, including 53.5% of those under age 18 and 0.0% of those age 65 or over.

Economy

The town's location in the Hugoton Friedrich Basin makes it an ideal source for helium production from natural gas. A helium plant was built near Keyes in 1958.  of liquid helium is produced annually by the Keyes Helium Company.

Notable people
 Jack Hoxie (1885–1965), rodeo cowboy, Hollywood silent movie cowboy actor

References

Towns in Cimarron County, Oklahoma
Towns in Oklahoma
Oklahoma Panhandle
Populated places established in 1925
1925 establishments in Oklahoma